Art vs. Science is the debut extended play from Australian electronic band Art vs. Science, self-released on 1 May 2009. The EP peaked at number 32 on the ARIA Charts in February 2010.

Dan Williams said "We recorded it all in one day, in one session, one mad day; locked ourselves in, with a lot of coffee and a lot of wine. We were set up in a room: it was all very minimal, no metronomes; just the producer screaming at us till we got it right."

At the ARIA Music Awards of 2009, the EP was nominated for ARIA Award for Breakthrough Artist – Single.

At the 2009 AIR Awards the EP won Best Independent Dance/Electronica.

Track listing

Charts and certification

Weekly charts

Certifications

References 

2009 debut EPs
Synth-pop EPs
EPs by Australian artists
Art vs. Science albums